The men's 100 metre backstroke was a swimming event held as part of the swimming at the 1920 Summer Olympics programme. It was the fourth appearance of the event.

A total of 12 swimmers from six nations competed in the event, which was held on Sunday, August 22 and on Monday, August 23, 1920.

Records

These were the standing world and Olympic records (in minutes) prior to the 1920 Summer Olympics.

In the first semi-final Ray Kegeris bettered the Olympic record to 1:17.8 minutes. In the second semi-final Warren Kealoha set a new world record with 1:14.8 minutes.

Results

Semifinals

Sunday, August 22, 1920: The fastest two in each semi-final and the faster of the two third-placed swimmer advanced to the final.

Semifinal 1

Semifinal 2

Final

Monday, August 23, 1920:

References

Notes
 
 

Swimming at the 1920 Summer Olympics
Men's events at the 1920 Summer Olympics